The Barbigha Municipal Council or Barbigha Nagar Parishad, is the civic body that governs Barbigha. Barbigha Municipal Council consists of democratically elected members, is headed by a Chairperson and administers the city's infrastructure, public services and supplies. Members from the state's leading various political parties hold elected offices in the council.

History
Earlier Barbigha had nagar panchayat status. In 2017,Barbigha Nagar Panchayat was promoted to Barbigha Municipal Council or Barbigha Nagar Parishad. It is the 2nd town in Sheikhpura district to get Municipal Council status.

Administration
Barbigha Municipal Council consists of 26 Ward councillors including a chairperson and a deputy chairperson. It is under the direct control of Executive Officer.

References

Sheikhpura district